Fuentes de Ebro is a municipality in the province of Zaragoza, Aragon, Spain. According to the 2005 census (INE), the municipality has a population of 4,086 inhabitants.

References

Municipalities in the Province of Zaragoza